The 2020–21 season is Levski Sofia's 100th season in the First League. This article shows player statistics and all matches (official and friendly) that the club will play during the 2020–21 season.

It is considered the worst season in the club's history. Levski finished on an all-time low 8th place, breaking a number of negative records. For the first time, the club finished a season with more losses than wins.

Transfers

In

Total spending: 50 000 €

Out

Total income: +425 000 € 

Net income: +375 000 €

Loans out

Squad

Updated on 6 May 2021.

Performance overview

Fixtures

Friendlies

Summer

Mid-season

Winter

Parva Liga

Preliminary stage

League table

Results summary

Results by round

Matches

Europa Conference League stage

League table

Results summary

Results by round

Matches

Bulgarian Cup

Squad statistics

|-
|colspan="14"|Players away from the club on loan:

|-
|colspan="14"|Players who left the club during the season:

|}

References 

PFC Levski Sofia seasons
Levski Sofia